Camarillo Airport  is a public airport located three miles (5 km) west of the central business district of Camarillo, a city in Ventura County, California, United States. The airport has one runway and serves privately operated general aviation and executive aircraft with no scheduled commercial service. A separate airfield in the southwest quadrant of the airport is for exclusive use of light-sport aircraft and ultralights. The airport is the site for an annual air show "Wings Over Camarillo", organized by the Southern California Wing of the Commemorative Air Force.

According to the FAA's National Plan of Integrated Airport Systems for 2011–2015, it is categorized as a reliever airport.

History 
Camarillo Airport was established in 1942 when the U.S. Public Roads Administration acquired  of farmland to develop a landing strip for light planes. The Aerospace Defense Command, via the 414th Fighter Group at Oxnard AFB, directed the 354th, 437th, and 460th Fighter-Interceptor Squadrons successively.  

In the years following the closure of Oxnard AFB in January 1970, the Ventura County government actively pursued the acquisition of the former military base property from the Department of Defense for commercial airport use. This initiative ran into public opposition, opposed primarily by local residents concerned about the noise of growing commercial traffic. The agreement also did not allow cargo and large commercial passenger flights. By 1985, the airport was entirely managed by the Ventura County Department of Airports.

From 1995 to 2012, one of the last Lockheed EC-121 Warning Stars underwent a major restoration and dominated the tarmac. After completion of work, it was flown out to the Yanks Air Museum in Chino, California. The Ventura County Department of Airports began work in 2022 on a layout plan dealing with maintenance and other near-term projects for the airport.

Facilities and operations
It has two helipads, both measuring 50 by 50 ft (15 x 15 m).
For a 12-month period ending June 5, 2006, the airport had 153,360 aircraft operations, an average of 420 per day: 98% general aviation, 2% air taxi and <1% military. There are 600 aircraft based at this airport: 84% single engine, 8% multi-engine, 5% ultralights, 3% jet aircraft and 1% helicopters.

The airport is an FAA-towered facility, with a number of Fixed-Base Operators headquartered at the airfield, including vintage aviation organizations.

The Camarillo Composite Squadron 61 of the California Wing of the Civil Air Patrol is based at this airfield, located near Sky Blue Air, at the east end of the airport.

The Ventura County Fire Department and Sheriff's Office each support large, separate facilities at opposite ends of the field to support new recruit and recurring refreshment training.

A "Viewport" opened in 2014, providing a child-friendly area to view the airport activities which had become difficult with increased security concerns.

The Chapter 723 of the Experimental Aircraft Association and its facilities are located to the west of CAF museum in two hangars.

CAF So. Cal. Air Museum 

The Southern California Wing of the Commemorative Air Force and its museum are located to the west of the Waypoint Cafe in three large hangars. In addition to a collection of displays, models, and artifacts, the museum is home to the following aircraft:

Airworthy

Alon A-2 Aircoupe c/r N5694F
Fairchild PT-19B c/r N50426
Fairchild F-24R-46 c/r N77696
Grumman F6F-5 Hellcat Minsi III c/r N1078Z
Messerschmitt Bf 108 D-1 Taifun c/r N2231
Mitsubishi A6M3 Mod. 22 Zero c/r N712Z
North American PBJ-1J Mitchell Semper Fi c/r N5865V (only surviving PBJ-1)
North American SNJ-4 Texan c/r N6411D
North American SNJ-5 Texan c/r N89014
Ryan Navion c/r N91644
Supermarine Spitfire FR Mk. XIVe c/r N749DP

Warbird rides are sold on the PBJ-1J Mitchell, SNJ Texans, PT-19, and Aircoupe.

Static/Restoration

Curtiss C-46 Commando China Doll c/r N53594
Fieseler Fi 156 D Storch c/r N40FS
Grumman F8F-2 Bearcat c/r N7825C
Mikoyan-Gurevich MiG-21MF c/n 965306 (cockpit section only)
Yakovlev Yak-50 c/r N950DK

Though not part of the CAF's fleet, the hangars are also home to the following aircraft:

American Aeronautical Foundation

North American B-25J Mitchell Executive Sweet c/r N30801

High Alpha Airshows

Antonov An-2R Big Panda II c/r N50670
Mikoyan-Gurevich MiG-17F c/r N117BR

Privately Owned

North American SNJ-5C Texan c/r N6438D (modified to resemble a Nakajima B5N2 "Kate" torpedo bomber for the film Tora! Tora! Tora!)
Beechcraft T-34B Mentor c/r N134RR

Accidents and incidents
On August 7, 2019, a private aircraft from Wheeler Express crashed  from the runway of the airport. Both people on board were killed.

On January 26, 2020, a helicopter en route to Camarillo Airport crashed into a hillside in Calabasas, California, under heavy fog, killing all nine people on board, including basketball player Kobe Bryant. The cause of the crash was pilot error and spatial disorientation.

The Ampaire Electric EEL completed the longest flight to date for an airplane employing electric propulsion after launching from the airport on October 8, 2020. The hybrid electric aircraft, developed by U.S. startup Ampaire, will be used in a series of demonstration flights with Mokulele Airlines on its short-haul routes. The plane had just undergone four weeks of flight testing over the Oxnard Plain.

References

External links 
 Camarillo Airport at County of Ventura website
 

Airports in Ventura County, California
Buildings and structures in Camarillo, California